Laura Marie Kaczor is a Christian contemporary musician, worship leader, speaker from Nashville, Tennessee, who is a Collegeville, Pennsylvania native. She released, Wake Me Up, in 2006, with Running Spirit Records. Her second album, Love Enough, was released by LifeThirst Records, in 2010. The song, "Alive in You", was her Billboard magazine breakthrough released, where it placed on the Christian Soft AC chart. The subsequent album, Restore Me, was released in 2015, through LifeThirst Records.

Background
Kaczor was born Laura Marie Kaczor in Collegeville, Pennsylvania, on September 16, 1982, whose father is Frederick "Fred" Kaczor, and her mother is Mary Kaczor. She has an older brother, Adam. She graduated from the University of Pennsylvania, in 2006. After graduation, Kaczor relocated to Nashville, Tennessee to pursue her songwriting and musical career.

Music history
Her music career commenced in 2006, when the album, Wake Me Up, was released on April 4, 2006, from Running Spirit Records. She released, Love Enough, with LifeThirst Records, on April 13, 2010. This contained, "Alive in You", her breakthrough released upon the Billboard magazine Christian Soft AC Chart, where it peaked at No. 17. The subsequent album, Restore Me, was released on July 10, 2015, by LifeThirst Records, and produced by Ian Eskelin.

She has worked with a number of contemporary Christian artists including 4Him, NewSong, Avalon, Phillips, Craig & Dean and many others.

Discography
Albums
 Wake Me Up (April 4, 2006, Running Spirit)
 Love Enough (April 13, 2010, LifeThirst)
 Restore Me (July 10, 2015, LifeThirst)
Singles
"Invisible"
"Alive in You" – Christian Soft AC # 17, July 2, 2011
"Yours Forever"

References

External links
 Official website
 Our Stage profile

1982 births
Living people
American performers of Christian music
Musicians from Pennsylvania
Musicians from Tennessee